Avdotya Ivanovna Chernysheva (February 12, 1693 – June 17, 1747) was a Russian noble and lady in waiting. She was the royal mistress of Tsar Peter the Great of Russia. She was the daughter of Prince Ivan Ivanovitch Rzyevskiy and Daria Gavrilovna and in 1710 married Prince  (1672–1745).

The relationship with Peter continued on and off from 1708 until 1725. In 1717, she was involved in the fall of her rival Mary Hamilton (lady in waiting). It is rumored that Peter died of syphilis after having been infected by Chernysheva, but there is nothing to indicate that she was herself ill. She was the lady in waiting of Empress Anna of Russia in 1730–1745.

References 
  Русский биографический словарь: В 25 т. /А. А. Половцов. — М., 1896—1918

1693 births
1747 deaths
Mistresses of Peter the Great
Tsardom of Russia ladies-in-waiting
Burials at Lazarevskoe Cemetery (Saint Petersburg)